The Jones Law Office, also known as the Lorenzo D. Kelly House, is a structure within the Appomattox Court House National Historical Park. In the nineteenth century the structure was owned by Kelly and used as a single-family house. The original law office was also used as a dwelling by John Robinson for his large family in the nineteenth century after Kelly.

The one room structure is historically significant to the Appomattox Court House National Historical Park and was registered in the National Park Service's database of Official Structures on June 26, 1989.

History
The Jones Law Office was originally constructed about 1850 for the law office and village home of Crawford Jones, Appomattox County farmer, attorney, and local secessionist leader. Early in 1854 he began sending one of his slaves into the village to purchase cotton handkerchiefs and cakes of "Yankie" soap. From the slave he learned of cheap rents Samuel D. McDearmon was charging for places
in the village of Appomattox Court House (then known also as Clover Hill). He decided to get a village law office for convenience, since it would be closer to the courthouse for him than where he normally lived.

In his book A Place Called Appomattox, historian William Marvel describes history of the building as follows:

{{quote|Until recently Jones, who was only twenty-three, had made his home on the family plantation out in the Walker's Church District; that was miles from the courthouse, and with the cheap rents McDearmon was asking there was no reason not to keep a little office (in the village). }}   
 
Later in his book Marvel describes further history of the building showing the distressing financial situation of the owner:

Crawford Jones
Jones made his regular home at his family's plantation. In 1850 William A. Jones (subject's father) had 66 slaves at this plantation. Crawford Jones (subject of article) had five slaves as of 1860 when he was 29 years old. He inherited several more slaves after his father's death, which he co-owned with his mother. Crawford was living at his father's plantation in 1850 but on his own in 1860, according to U.S. Census for Appomattox County. He died in the summer of 1863 leaving his wife, Elizabeth, with the law office in the village.

Lorenzo D. Kelly
The Jones Law Office has the name of the Lorenzo D. Kelly house and was misidentified by the National Park Service in their 1989 National Register of Historic Places Registration application. The U.S. Census for the year of 1850 for Appomattox  County shows Lorenzo as a wheelwright. In 1860 he is shown as living at the Jones Law Office structure, with his widowed mother, two of his younger siblings and his grandmother. At the time of Gen. Lee's surrender in 1865 the structure was located a little more than a hundred yards away from the Bocock-Isbell house behind the Clover Hill Tavern in the village.

John Robertson (Robinson)
Around 1867 John Robertson (a black shoemaker) and his wife lived in the structure with three children. In November 1869 there was a fourth child added to the Robertson family, all living in this one-room building in the village. Robertson and his wife are buried in a small graveyard behind the house. The Civil War historian William Marvel uses the spelling Robertson, while the National Park Service uses the spelling Robinson.

Historical significance
The Appomattox Court House National Historical Park declares there are three of the National Register Criteria that make the structure historically significant.

Criteria A - It has meaningful value because of its association with the site of the surrender of the Confederacy's supreme military commander and its principal army, which represented the conclusion of the American Civil War.
Criteria B - It has meaningful value because of its association with the site of the surrender of Gen. Robert E. Lee and his subordinate commanders to Lt. Gen. Ulysses S. Grant, future President of the United States.
Criteria C - It preserves the distinctive characteristics of embodying the period and method of construction typical in Piedmont Virginia in the mid-nineteenth century. It is considered typical of a county government seat and of a typical farming community in mid-nineteenth century Virginia.

Description

The Jones Law Office is a single story structure furnished on the first floor as a simple home of a mid-nineteenth century craftsman. It has a centered entry door with a single window on the side. The hall house is one room deep and is of post and beam construction. The house comes with a full attic and a raised cellar. It is about twenty one and a half feet wide and seventeen and a half feet deep. The west side elevation is centered with an end gable exterior sandstone chimney. It has an enclosed cellar entry with a shed roof. 

The typical single residence one story pedimented house has an entry porch at the center entry. It is sheathed in unpainted weatherboards with five to five and a half inch exposure. The gable roof is covered with round-butt wood shingles with box cornice and crown moulding at the eaves and simple rake with ogee moulding at the gable ends. The first floor windows are 6/6 double hung sashes without shutters. A similar 6/9 double hung sash window is on the principal floor. The attic story on the gable ends has four-light upward-swinging casement sashes. The basement sashes are four-light hoppers.

The rear door on the south side has a centered four-paneled door providing to the first floor and another pair of cellar casements of three light.
The front entrance on the north side has a porch with facing pediment covered in clapboards with two six-inch square posts and two six foot by three inch pilasters, simple one foot by three-quarter inch balusters. It has a heavy rounded rail on the side only and four riser steps. Flanking the porch to the west is a 6/9 sash window. No windows have shutters. The interior has been restored, however due to its age it has little integrity. The structure exterior was restored in 1963.

Interior

Footnotes

Sources
 Bradford, Ned, Battles and Leaders of the Civil War, Plume, 1989
 Catton, Bruce, A Stillness at Appomattox, Doubleday 1953, Library of Congress # 53-9982, 
 Catton, Bruce, This Hallowed Ground, Doubleday 1953, Library of Congress # 56-5960
 Chaffin, Tom, 2006.  Sea of Gray: The Around-the-World Odyssey of the Confederate Raider Shenandoah, Hill and Wang/Farrar, Straus and Giroux,.
 Davis, Burke, The Civil War: Strange & Fascinating Facts, Wings Books, 1960 & 1982, 
 Davis, Burke, To Appomattox - Nine April Days, 1865, Eastern Acorn Press, 1992, 
 Featherston, Nathaniel Ragland, Appomattox County History and Genealogy, Genealogical Publishing Company, 1998, 
 Gutek, Patricia, Plantations and Outdoor Museums in America's Historic South, University of South Carolina Press, 1996, 
 Hosmer, Charles Bridgham, Preservation Comes of Age: From Williamsburg to the National Trust, 1926-1949, Preservation Press, National Trust for Historic Preservation in the United States by the University Press of Virginia, 1981
 Kaiser, Harvey H., The National Park Architecture Sourcebook, Princeton Architectural Press, 2008, 
 Kennedy, Frances H., The Civil War Battlefield Guide, Houghton Mifflin Company, 1990, 
 Korn, Jerry et al., The Civil War, Pursuit to Appomattox, The Last Battles, Time-Life Books, 1987, 
 Marvel, William, A Place Called Appomattox, UNC Press, 2000, 
 Marvel, William, Lee's Last Retreat, UNC Press, 2006, 
 McPherson, James M., Battle Cry of Freedom, Oxford University Press, 1988,
 National Park Service, Appomattox Court House: Appomattox Court House National Historical Park, Virginia, U.S. Dept. of the Interior, 2002, 
 Tidwell, William A., April '65: Confederate Covert Action in the American Civil War, Kent State University Press, 1995, 
 Weigley, Russel F., A Great Civil War: A Military and Political History, 1861-1865'', Indiana University Press, 2000, 

Appomattox Court House National Historical Park
Historic district contributing properties in Virginia
Law offices
Legal history of Virginia